Ewa Mazierska (born 1964 in Włocławek, Poland) is a reader in Contemporary Cinema, in the Department of Humanities of the University of Central Lancashire. Her publications include various articles in Polish and English and a number of monographs. She also co-edited Relocating Britishness (co-authors: John Walton, Susan Sydney-Smith, and Steven Caunce; Manchester University Press, 2004).

Education:
1987; Masters in philosophy, Warsaw University, Poland
1995; Ph.D., Lódz University, Poland

Film critic Michał Oleszczyk writes she is one of the two Poland-born scholars leading the field of Polish films studies outside Poland (the other one being Marek Haltof).

Selected bibliography

In English 
 2003 - From Moscow to Madrid: European Cities, Postmodern Cinema (co-author: Laura Rascaroli)
 2004 - Dreams and Diaries: The Cinema of Nanni Moretti (co-author: Laura Rascaroli)
 2006 - Crossing New Europe: Postmodern Travel and the European Road Movie
 2006 - Women in Polish Cinema
 2007 - Roman Polanski: The Cinema of a Cultural Traveller
 2007 - Polish Postcommunist Cinema: From Pavement Level
 2008 - Larks on a String: Masculinities in Polish and Czech and Slovak Cinema
 2010 - Jerzy Skolimowski: The Cinema of a Nonconformist

In Polish 
 1999 - Człowiek wobec kultury: James Ivory i jego filmy (Oficyna Wydawnicza ER)
 1999 - Uwięzienie w teraźniejszości i inne postmodernistyczne stany: Twórczość Wong Kar-Waia (Książka i Prasa)
 2007 - Słoneczne kino Pedra Almodóvara (Słowo/Obraz Terytoria)
 2010 - Pasja. Filmy Jean-Luca Godarda (Korporacja Ha!art)

References

1964 births
Living people
Academics of the University of Central Lancashire
University of Warsaw alumni
University of Łódź alumni
Polish women academics
Polish film critics
British film critics
Women film critics
People from Włocławek